Thomas Jefferson High School was a public high school in Port Arthur, Texas and a part of the Port Arthur Independent School District. Prior to 1965 schools were segregated by race and white students attended Jefferson; the school began admitting black students that year.

In 2002 it merged into Memorial High School.

References

External links
 

2002 disestablishments in Texas
Educational institutions disestablished in 2002
Public high schools in Texas
High schools in Jefferson County, Texas